Guiembé is a town in north-central Ivory Coast. It is a sub-prefecture and commune of Dikodougou Department in Poro Region, Savanes District.

In 2014, the population of the sub-prefecture of Guiembé was 16,772.

Villages
The 22 villages of the sub-prefecture of Guiembé and their population in 2014 are:

Notes

Sub-prefectures of Poro Region
Communes of Poro Region